Rudolf Babiak (12 April 1956 – 16 July 2020) was a Slovak gymnast. He competed in eight events at the 1980 Summer Olympics.

References

1956 births
2020 deaths
Slovak male artistic gymnasts
Olympic gymnasts of Czechoslovakia
Gymnasts at the 1980 Summer Olympics
Sportspeople from Banská Bystrica